Love Bytes is an Australian anthology series which premiered on the Fox8 subscription television channel in 2004. The series follows the lives and exploits of people involved in electronic dating. The series also screened on UKTV.

Episodes and Cast

Episode 1: Trust Up
Bea discovers that Callum, the man she met at a nightclub and slept with, has been hooking up with her best friend Joe, who he met on a gay chat line.
 Abi Tucker as Bea
 Teo Gebert as Joe
 Michael Piccirilli as Callum

Episode 2: Cocktales
Three women meet a man called "Larry" on an online dating website and arrange to meet him in a bar. One of the women who has been stood up gets to know the barman and goes home with him instead.
 Natalie Saleeba

Episode 3: Four Play
A yuppie couple decide to join a swingers group.

Episode 4: Net Nanny
John is trying to find love online where he meets Clare, the Net Nanny.
 Nathaniel Dean as John
 Amanda Dougue as Clare
 Alex O'Loughlin as Dave

Additional cast
 Simon Bossell
 Amy Mathews as Mel
 Christopher Sommers as Neal
 Richard McDonald as He
 Pauline Roxo as She
 Amie Mckenna as Clara
 Christopher Sommers as Neal
 Luke Stephens as Jim the Waiter
 Laura Keneally	
 Paul Ashcroft

Awards
Love Bytes was nominated for a Logie Award for Most Outstanding Drama Series at the 2005 Logie Awards.

References

External links
 
Australian Television Information Archive
Screen Australia

Fox8 original programming
Australian drama television series
2004 Australian television series debuts
2004 Australian television series endings
English-language television shows